Correo del Orinoco  (the Orinoco Post) was a Venezuelan newspaper created by Simón Bolívar. As such, it is the oldest sovereign newspaper on the Latin American continent and South America.  The weekly paper was published from 1818 to 1822 in Angostura, a city on the river Orinoco which has since been renamed Ciudad Bolívar. 

The newspaper's name is currently exclusively used by the Correo del Orinoco newspaper produced by the Government of Venezuela.

See also
 List of newspapers in Venezuela

External links
 Pages from the newspaper at Biblioteca Virtual Cervantes

Defunct newspapers published in Venezuela
Defunct weekly newspapers
Mass media in Ciudad Bolívar
Newspapers published in Venezuela
Publications established in 1818
Publications disestablished in 1822
Spanish-language newspapers